Willowdale is a small, unincorporated community located in East Marlborough Township, in southern Chester County, Pennsylvania.

It is named after a grove of Willow trees that grew in the general area when it was originally settled.

Several businesses, shopping centers and residential developments in the general area of the crossroads are named for Willowdale.

Geography
Willowdale is located at 39° 52' 27" North, 75° 43' 5" West.

It is located at the crossroads of Pennsylvania Routes 926 and 82, between Kennett Square and Unionville, Pennsylvania.  In addition, it is very close to Longwood Gardens and a 20-minute drive from downtown Wilmington, DE.

Education
Willowdale is located in the Unionville-Chadds Ford School District.

History
18th Century 
Originally the crossroads was called Taggarts Crossroads for the Taggart family, who owned a stone inn constructed in 1730 and is still extant on the Northwest corner of the crossroads. Another 18th-century house, standing on the Northeast section of the crossroads, is a quaint fieldstone house, once mentioned in an article as being the "Oldest House West of the Brandywine." While that title can be disputed between other homesteads, it is still an ancient structure. On September 11th, 1777, British forces under Lord Charles Cornwallis' marched directly through the quiet crossroads in the morning. The route Cornwallis took was a flanking maneuver in which he was to surprise and flank Washington instead of confronting his main force at Chadds Ford. When Cornwallis reached the crossroads, he encountered a small party of American troops under Lieutenant Colonel James Ross of the 8th Pennsylvania regiment. Ross, who was part of the many pickets lines General Washington's forces used that day, fired three shots before retreating and later following the rearguard of the British army skirmishing with them along the Great Valley Road before reporting his findings of a flanking maneuver to Washington. 

19th Century
During the 19th century, the crossroads grew as the area, which had many locally grown willow trees, was shipped to the nearby Du Pont Factory to make black powder. The black powder, which was 15% charcoal, needed the process of burning trees to produce it and willow trees were among the best woods to burn. Due to this growth, a post office, general store, church, wheelwright shop, blacksmith, and church were constructed during the late 19th century in and around the crossroads. In 1866 Josiah Pyle and William Rakestraw, both landowners in the crossroads, formed the Rakeshaw-Pyle nursies on the northeast of the crossroads near the present-day Willowdale Church. The property included a greenhouse, water tower, and gardens. The business still exists in the same area today, known as RP Nursies. 

20th Century
In the 20th century, continuing growth was noted as in 1906, a trolly line owned by the West Chester Street Rail company was constructed and went through the present-day crossroads following the Unionville Road. The service originating in Kennett Square stopped at the station within the general store near the crossroads at Willowdale 10 minutes before and after each hour throughout the day. There was once a trolley switch between the chapel building and the station. The switch allowed two trolley cars to pass by each other, going in opposite directions to and from Kennett Square. The trolley ran through the area until 1929 when a bus route replaced the service. Today you can still see the outline of the trolly line on the stonewall lining on the left side of the Unionville Road driving Southwards. By that time, the church had outgrown the original structure had built a larger structure directly across from the original church. The Congregation still exists today with services each Sunday. During the later part of the 20th century, as Chester County was becoming increasingly suburbanized and developed, the crossroads again received a surge in development. The area occupying the Northeastern side of the crossroads was heavily developed, with the original general store and various outbuildings being razed. The barn and stone house were also converted into an office space. Today this area is known for varying commercial services such as food, health, financing, and local state government offices. Still, the intersection retains much of its rural appearance as it essentially acts as the boundary between suburban and rural Pennsylvania due to much of the land West of the crossroads being majority farmland. In contrast, land East of the crossroads is the majority of housing developments.

Local attractions

Willowdale Steeplechase:  The Willowdale Steeplechase Races are sanctioned by the National Steeplechase Association and attract some of the best racehorses and top jockeys from around the world.  Set in a natural amphitheater the course features traditional European hedges, post, and rail fences and a spectacular water jump.

Longwood Gardens (About 5 minutes from Willowdale):   of gardens, woodlands, and meadows; 20 outdoor gardens; 20 indoor gardens within 4 acres (16,000 m²) of heated greenhouses; 11,000 different types of plants; spectacular fountains.  An international garden destination.

Brandywine Battlefield (About 15 minutes from Willowdale):  The Battle of Brandywine and the American Revolution are presented in the Museum which is part of the park's modern Visitor Center. A permanent interpretive exhibit and an audio-visual presentation graphically tell the story of the battle and its relation to the Philadelphia Campaign of 1777. Changing exhibits cover other topics of interest pertaining to the American Revolution and offer something new for the frequent visitor.

References

External links
Unionville-Chadds Ford School District Website
East Marlborough Township Website
Willowdale Steeplechase Website
 Longwood Website
 Brandywine Battlefield Website

Unincorporated communities in Chester County, Pennsylvania
Unincorporated communities in Pennsylvania